Pak Kok Village is a village on Lamma Island, Hong Kong. It comprises the two settlements Pak Kok Kau Tsuen and Pak Kok San Tsuen.

Administration
Pak Kok Kau Tsuen and Pak Kok San Tsuen are recognized villages under the New Territories Small House Policy.

History
At the time of the 1911 census, the population of Pak Kok was 52. The number of males was 15.

References

External links

 Delineation of area of existing village Pak Kok Kau Tsuen (Lamma North) for election of resident representative (2019 to 2022)
 Delineation of area of existing village Pak Kok San Tsuen (Lamma North) for election of resident representative (2019 to 2022)

Villages in Islands District, Hong Kong
Lamma Island